The men's +100 kg competition of the 2011 World Judo Championships was held on August 27.

Medalists

Results

Pool A

Pool B

Pool C

Pool D

Repechage

Finals

References

External links
 
 Draw

M101
World Judo Championships Men's Heavyweight